Stefano Ferrari (born 1 January 1921, date of death unknown) was an Italian professional football player. Born in Milan, he played for 2 seasons (47 games, 13 goals) in the Serie A for A.S. Roma. Ferrari is deceased.

References

1921 births
Year of death missing
Italian footballers
Serie A players
Brescia Calcio players
A.S. Roma players
U.S. 1913 Seregno Calcio players
Association football midfielders